Redbird Reef is an artificial reef located in the Atlantic Ocean, off the coast of Slaughter Beach, Delaware,  east of the Indian River Inlet.

The reef comprises 714 Redbird (R26–R36 series) New York City Subway cars dumped by Weeks Marine,  86 retired tanks and armored personnel carriers, eight tugboats and barges, and 3,000 tons of ballasted truck tires.

The amount of marine food has increased 400 times over 7 years.

The site is the most visited reef site off Delaware's coast, receiving more than 10,000 fishing parties annually, and is home to numerous marine species, including black sea bass, flounder, blue mussels, sponges, barnacles, and coral. Also, tuna and mackerel hunt at the reef. The site has become so popular that fishermen steal from each other, and other states apply for the next subway cars to be dumped in their waters.

See also

Marine biology
Temple Reef

References

Deepwater Reef Coordinates: Reference for coordinates

Further reading

External links
Exact coordinates for submerged objects

Artificial reefs
Buildings and structures completed in 2001
Reefs of the Atlantic Ocean
Landforms of Delaware
Ecosystems
Reefs of the United States
New York City Subway rolling stock
2001 establishments in Delaware